The 2021 NASCAR PEAK Mexico Series was the fourteenth season of the NASCAR PEAK Mexico Series, a regional stock car racing series sanctioned by NASCAR in Mexico. It was the seventeenth season of the series as a NASCAR-sanctioned series. It began with the race at Súper Óvalo Chiapas on 23 May and ended with the race at Autódromo Miguel E. Abed on 5 December.

Salvador de Alba Jr. won his first championship in the series, prevailing in a tight points battle he and three-time series champion Rubén García Jr. had during the season. Both of them as well as two-time series champion Abraham Calderón, defending series champion Rubén Rovelo, and José Luis Ramírez won races in 2021.

This was the last year that PEAK (and parent company Old World Industries) was the title sponsor of the series. In 2022, the name of the series changed to the NASCAR Mexico Series after a replacement title sponsor was not found.

Schedule, results and standings

Schedule and race results
Source:

Drivers' championship

Source: 

 Salvador de Alba Jr. – 483
 Rubén García Jr. – 477
 Abraham Calderón – 428
 Max Gutiérrez – 405
 Rubén Rovelo – 379
 Rogelio López – 338
 Omar Jurado – 328
 Jake Cosío – 318
 Rubén Pardo – 316
 Germán Quiroga – 313
 Jorge Goeters – 312
 Santiago Tovar – 298
 Manuel Gutiérrez – 292
 José Luis Ramírez – 291
 Xavi Razo – 236
 Juan Manuel González – 141
 Michel Jourdain Jr. – 56
 Hugo Oliveras – 52
 Enrique Baca – 51

See also
 2021 NASCAR Cup Series
 2021 NASCAR Xfinity Series
 2021 NASCAR Camping World Truck Series
 2021 ARCA Menards Series
 2021 ARCA Menards Series East
 2021 ARCA Menards Series West
 2021 NASCAR Whelen Modified Tour
 2021 NASCAR Pinty's Series
 2021 NASCAR Whelen Euro Series
 2021 eNASCAR iRacing Pro Invitational Series
 2021 SRX Series

References

External links
 

NASCAR PEAK Mexico Series
NASCAR PEAK Mexico Series